Diondre Overton (born April 19, 1998) is an American football wide receiver for the Philadelphia Stars of the United States Football League (USFL). He played college football at Clemson and has also spent time with the Hamilton Tiger-Cats and Vienna Vikings.

Early life and education
Overton was born on April 19, 1998, in Greensboro, North Carolina. He attended Walter Hines Page Senior High School in Greensboro, North Carolina, where he competed in football and basketball. As a junior, he averaged 14.6 points per game in basketball and made 31 catches for 577 yards in football. As a senior in football, he made 78 receptions for 1,251 yards and scored 15 touchdowns. He was the number four overall prospect in the state according to 247Sports.

Overton committed to Clemson University over offers from NC State, North Carolina, South Carolina, and Tennessee. As a freshman in 2016, he made two catches for 48 yards and scored a touchdown on his first career reception. In 2017, Overton played in 14 games and made 14 catches for 178 yards. As a junior in 2018, he caught 14 passes and scored three touchdowns while gaining 199 yards in 14 games.

As a senior in 2019, Overton recorded 22 catches for 352 yards and scored three touchdowns, appearing in 15 games with five starts. He was voted a team captain and was an Academic All-ACC selection. In a win against Boston College, he tied the school record with three touchdown catches, making a career-high 119 yards to earn offensive player of the game and ACC receiver of the week honors.

Overton won two national championships at Clemson (in 2016 and 2018), and finished his college career with 52 catches for 777 yards and seven touchdowns.

Professional career
After spending 2020 out of football, Overton was signed by the Hamilton Tiger-Cats of the Canadian Football League (CFL) in June . He was released shortly afterwards.

In November 2021, Overton was signed by the Vienna Vikings of the European League of Football (ELF).

Overton was selected in the 16th round of the 2022 USFL Draft by the Philadelphia Stars. He was ruled inactive for the game against the Tampa Bay Bandits on May 21, 2022, with a hamstring strain.

Statistics

References

Further reading

1998 births
Living people
Players of American football from North Carolina
American football wide receivers
Clemson Tigers football players
Hamilton Tiger-Cats players
Vienna Vikings players
Philadelphia Stars (2022) players
American expatriate players of American football
American expatriate sportspeople in Austria